Patima Jeerapaet is a Thai businessman.

Life and education 

Patima Jeerapaet is the son of Premsak and Pathama Jeerapaet. Patima Jeerapaet graduated primary and secondary school from Saint Gabriel's College. He earned his bachelor's degree in Business Administration (BBA) and master's degree in Business Administration (MBA) from Assumption University (Thailand). In 2009, he received a Doctorate of Philosophy in Management and Organization Development (Phd. OD) from Assumption University (Thailand).

He also attended several Top Executive Programs from well-known institutions in Thailand such as the Certificate in Directors Certification Program DCP 66/2005 from the Thai Institute of Directors, Financial Institutions Governance Program (FGP) 7/2013 from the Thai Institute of Directors, Top Executives Program (CMA 13) of the Capital Market Academy, an institution of the Stock Exchange of Thailand (SET), Top Executive Program in Commerce and Trade (TEPCoT 6) from Commerce Academy, Top Executive of Urban Development Program (Mahanakorn 2) from the Urban Green Development Institute Bangkok and Top Executive Program for Industrial Development and Investment (IBID 1) from the Institute of Business and Industrial Development.

Working experience 

Patima Jeerapaet was the Assistant to Chairman of Phyathai Hospitals Group, Paolo Memorial Hospital Group and CTH Public Company Limited. He was the Vice Chairman of PB Partners.

He spent much of his early career in the real estate business including managing director of C.I.T. Property Consultants Co., Ltd. or Colliers International Thailand, until he served as the President of Thailand Automotive Institute (TAI) in 2012, working to reach the objective of being one of the top ten highest automotive manufacturers in the world, to expand its testing centre, proving ground, etc. He was the brain behind the success of The Thailand Automotive Institute's five-year master plan for 2012–2016.

In 2013, he was appointed Director General of the Office of the Small and Medium Enterprises Promotion (OSMEP), Director and Secretary of Board of Executive Directors at the Office of Small and Medium Enterprises Promotion, Director and Secretary of Board of Director at the National Board of Small and Medium Enterprises Promotion, and Director of board of directors at Small and Medium Enterprise Development Bank of Thailand (SME Bank) (2013–2014). He was also one of Working Committee on Initial Proposal Consideration of Eco Car 2 Project.

Relevant experience

Patima Jeerapaet held a position as board member in CTH International Co., Ltd, WTH Group Co., Ltd., WTH Holding Co., Ltd. and Solution Power Networks Co., Ltd. He also served as advisor to the Board of Executive Directors of Grande Asset Hotel and Property Public Co., Ltd.

He was the Advisor of Subcommittee Industry Reform by National Reform Council and the current Advisor to President of The Engineering Institute of Thailand under H.M. The King's Patronage.

He began his political career as the Advisor to Minister of the Prime Minister's Office in 2012. From 2012 to 2013 he served as the Advisor to Committee on Monetary, Finance, Banking and Financial Institutions, the Senate of Kingdom of Thailand and the Advisor of International Trade and Investment at Thailand Trade Representative in 2013.

In 2011 Patima was announced as the first Thai Chairman of RICS Thailand (Royal Institution of Chartered Surveyors Thailand).

Besides being an investor, Patima also played role in Education. He was a special lecturer at Ramkhamhaeng University for 18 years and a special lecturer in Sport Facility Management to Doctoral Degree students Kasetsart University. Moreover, he was the Founder of the Department of Real Estate Management, Faculty of Risk Management and Industrial Services at Assumption University.

Major accomplishments 

During his time as the President of Thailand Automotive Institute (TAI), he headed up several successful project including: the Automotive Industry Master Plan 2012–2016  and Study and Analysis of setting up the Automotive Testing and R&D Center.

With moreover than 20 years of experience in the real estate business, Patima had managed a multitude of successful projects. On behalf of The Joint Foreign Chamber of Commerce (JFCCT Property Committee) from 2009 to 2010, he compiled and submitted a white paper for leasehold extension to the Thai Trade Representative office.

He took a recreational interest in Music, and served as Executive Producer of a song project in contribution to His Majesty King Bhumibol Adulyadej's 60th Anniversary ascension to the throne. He was also the Charity Car Rally organizer for the achievement of His Majesty's Cup.  All proceeds were contributed to the Chaiyapat Association for charity in 1999.

References

1967 births
Patima Jeerapaet
Patima Jeerapaet
Living people